ABC DJ is a Singaporean sitcom on MediaCorp TV Channel 5. This show often makes references to sensitive issues such as culture shock and racial discrimination.

Plot Summary and Cast

DJ (Dong-Jin) and Master Zhang
This series is about an American-born Chinese "brat" from Beverly Hills named Chia Dong-Jin, also known as Dong-Jin or DJ (Eugene Lee), who is a rich, spoilt and almost-worthless Americanized Chinese that was sent or banished to Singapore by his father, Master Zhang, to live with a conservative Chinese family, the Gohs, so that DJ will learn about Chinese culture.

DJ was tricked by his father into going to Singapore. He thought he was in Singapore on a vacation when he received a phone call from his father, explaining to DJ that he had come to Singapore not for a vacation but to live with the Goh family to learn the traditional Chinese culture from them. However, DJ did not adapt well to the Chinese traditions, such as filial piety.  During the stay with the Goh family, DJ was often being threatened or bullied by Goh, and his family. DJ was often regarded as a Chinese ang moh, a Singlish term for a Chinese person who lives in the West.

The Goh family and others

Goh Boon Keng (Richard Low), who is a sinseh (a traditional Chinese medicine) pupil to Master Zhang and a greatest threat to DJ, lives together with his wife, Hwee (Margaret Lim), his two children, Fann (Ezann Lee), a bookworm and Jeng Lo (Deng Mao Hui), who is regarded as a sissy and his old, illiterate and dimwitted father, Ah Kong (Marcus Chin). Goh Boon Keng works in a "sinseh" (traditional Chinese medicine) shop. Together, the Goh family lived in a Toa Payoh HDB flat. Ah Kong has an old Indian friend called Gana (Subin Subaiah), a former butcher in a nearby foodstall, who is also as equally illiterate as him. Occasionally, they together get into fights and arguments unexpectedly. Deepak (Vignesh V) is Fann's closest school friend. To DJ, Fann and Deepak are considered as "nerds", an English slang for a stereotypical person who is boring and is not attractive in terms of their appearance and outlook.

Recurring and Minor Characters plus Guest Appearances
Gana played by Subin Subaiah (occurred in some episodes).
Deepak played by Vignesh V (occurred in some episodes).
Lee Tok Kong played by Mark Lee (in episode 7).
Lily Lee played by Margaret Lee (in episode 7).
Phua Chu Kang played by Gurmit Singh (in episode 7).
Rosie Phua played by Irene Ang (in episode 7).
Ah Goon played by Ray Kuan (in episode 7).

Production history
The show started airing in Singapore on MediaCorp TV Channel 5 on 23 May 2006. AZN TV host and American deejay Eugene Lee is one of the main actors in the show, along with veteran Channel 8 actors Richard Low and Margaret Lim. Singaporean child actors Ezann Lee and Deng Mao Hui were also played as one of the main characters in that show. Vignesh V, an actor from Fly Entertainment, were also one of the stars of the show but he only appears in some episodes. In addition, Subin Subiah were also one of the main casts in the show.

Guest stars such as Mark Lee, Margaret Lee, Gurmit Singh, Irene Ang and Ray Kuan have appeared in the 7th episode of the debut season of the show.

Episodes

Broadcasters

External links
 IMDb
 
 
 Article about the show's stars
 ABC DJ commentary forum
 ABC DJ programme showcase
 Episode Guide & Synopsis at MOBTV

2006 Singaporean television series debuts
2006 Singaporean television series endings
Singaporean comedy television series
Channel 5 (Singapore) original programming